Titani (Titáni; before 1927: Voivonta (Βοϊβοντά, Voïvontá), from the Slavic title "voivode") is a village in the municipality of Sikyona, Corinthia, Greece. It is situated at the foot of the mountain Vesizas, above the left bank of the river Asopos, at 580 m elevation. The ancient city Titane was situated near the present village. In 2011, it had a population of 216. It is 1 km northeast of Bozikas, 15 km southwest of Kiato and 27 km west of Corinth.

Population

History

Ancient Titane was part of the city-state of Sicyon. It is named after Titan, a brother of Helios. The city had a temple of Asclepius, built by Alexanor, a grandson of Asclepius. There were also a temple of Athena, and an altar of the Winds. The acropolis of the ancient city has been excavated.

See also
List of settlements in Corinthia

References

External links
Titani at the GTP Travel Pages

Populated places in Corinthia
Sicyon